Yawarqucha (Quechua yawar blood, qucha, lake, "blood lake", Hispanicized spelling Yahuarcocha) is a mountain in the Huancavelica Region in Peru, about  high. It is situated in the Castrovirreyna Province, Santa Ana District, in the Huancavelica Province, Huachocolpa District, and in the Huaytará Province, Pilpichaca District. Yawarqucha lies north-east of the lake Chuqlluqucha.

References 

Mountains of Peru
Mountains of Huancavelica Region